Pogost Nikolsky is a rural locality (a selo) in Kharovskoye Rural Settlement, Kharovsky District, Vologda Oblast, Russia. The population was 123 as of 2002. There are 6 streets.

Geography 
Pogost Nikolsky is located 17 km southwest of Kharovsk (the district's administrative centre) by road. Dyakovskaya is the nearest rural locality.

References 

Rural localities in Kharovsky District